Isoprene, or 2-methyl-1,3-butadiene, is a common volatile organic compound with the formula CH2=C(CH3)−CH=CH2. In its pure form it is a colorless volatile liquid. It is produced by many plants and animals (including humans) and its polymers are the main component of natural rubber.  C. G. Williams named the compound in 1860 after obtaining it from the pyrolysis of natural rubber; he correctly deduced the empirical formula C5H8.

Natural occurrences
Isoprene is produced and emitted by many species of trees (major producers are oaks, poplars, eucalyptus, and some legumes). Yearly production of isoprene emissions by vegetation is around 600 million metric tons, half from tropical broadleaf trees and the remainder primarily from shrubs. This is about equivalent to methane emissions and accounts for around one-third of all hydrocarbons released into the atmosphere. In deciduous forests, isoprene makes up approximately 80% of hydrocarbon emissions. While their input is small compared to trees, microscopic and macroscopic algae also produce isoprene.

Plants
Isoprene is made through the methyl-erythritol 4-phosphate pathway (MEP pathway, also called the non-mevalonate pathway) in the chloroplasts of plants. One of the two end-products of MEP pathway, dimethylallyl pyrophosphate (DMAPP), is cleaved by the enzyme isoprene synthase to form isoprene and diphosphate. Therefore, inhibitors that block the MEP pathway, such as fosmidomycin, also block isoprene formation. Isoprene emission increases dramatically with temperature and maximizes at around 40 °C. This has led to the hypothesis that isoprene may protect plants against heat stress (thermotolerance hypothesis, see below). Emission of isoprene is also observed in some bacteria and this is thought to come from non-enzymatic degradations from DMAPP. Global emission of isoprene by plants is estimated at around 350 million tons per year.

Regulation
Isoprene emission in plants is controlled both by the availability of the substrate (DMAPP) and by enzyme (isoprene synthase) activity. In particular, light, CO2 and O2 dependencies of isoprene emission are controlled by substrate availability, whereas temperature dependency of isoprene emission is regulated both by substrate level and enzyme activity.

Other organisms 
Isoprene is the most abundant hydrocarbon measurable in the breath of humans. The estimated production rate of isoprene in the human body is 0.15 µmol/(kg·h), equivalent to approximately 17 mg/day for a person weighing 70 kg. Isoprene is common in low concentrations in many foods. Many species of soil and marine bacteria, such as Actinomycetota, are capable of degrading isoprene and using it as a fuel source.

Biological roles
Isoprene emission appears to be a mechanism that trees use to combat abiotic stresses. In particular, isoprene has been shown to protect against moderate heat stress (around 40 °C). It may also protect plants against large fluctuations in leaf temperature. Isoprene is incorporated into and helps stabilize cell membranes in response to heat stress.

Isoprene also confers resistance to reactive oxygen species. The amount of isoprene released from isoprene-emitting vegetation depends on leaf mass, leaf area, light (particularly photosynthetic photon flux density, or PPFD) and leaf temperature. Thus, during the night, little isoprene is emitted from tree leaves, whereas daytime emissions are expected to be substantial during hot and sunny days, up to 25 μg/(g dry-leaf-weight)/hour in many oak species.

Isoprenoids
The isoprene skeleton can be found in naturally occurring compounds called terpenes (also known as isoprenoids), but these compounds do not arise from isoprene itself. Instead, the precursor to isoprene units in biological systems is dimethylallyl pyrophosphate (DMAPP) and its isomer isopentenyl pyrophosphate (IPP). The plural 'isoprenes' is sometimes used to refer to terpenes in general.

Examples of isoprenoids include carotene, phytol, retinol (vitamin A), tocopherol (vitamin E), dolichols, and squalene. Heme A has an isoprenoid tail, and lanosterol, the sterol precursor in animals, is derived from squalene and hence from isoprene. The functional isoprene units in biological systems are dimethylallyl pyrophosphate (DMAPP) and its isomer isopentenyl pyrophosphate (IPP), which are used in the biosynthesis of naturally occurring isoprenoids such as carotenoids, quinones, lanosterol derivatives (e.g. steroids) and the prenyl chains of certain compounds (e.g. phytol chain of chlorophyll).  Isoprenes are used in the cell membrane monolayer of many Archaea, filling the space between the diglycerol tetraether head groups. This is thought to add structural resistance to harsh environments in which many Archaea are found.

Similarly, natural rubber is composed of linear polyisoprene chains of very high molecular weight and other natural molecules.

Impact on aerosols
After release, isoprene is converted into various species, such as aldehydes, hydroperoxides, organic nitrates, and epoxides by short-lived free radicals (like the hydroxyl radical) and to a lesser extent by ozone. These new species can dissolve into water droplets and contribute to aerosol and haze formation. Secondary organic aerosols formed from this pathway are a current topic of research and may have atmospheric impacts.

While most experts acknowledge that isoprene emission affects aerosol formation, whether isoprene increases or decreases aerosol formation is debated. A second major effect of isoprene on the atmosphere is that in the presence of nitric oxides (NOx) it contributes to the formation of tropospheric (lower atmosphere) ozone, which is one of the leading air pollutants in many countries. Isoprene itself is not normally regarded as a pollutant, as it is a natural plant product. Formation of tropospheric ozone is only possible in presence of high levels of NOx, which comes almost exclusively from industrial activities. Isoprene can have the opposite effect and quench ozone formation under low levels of NOx.

As an example the Blue Ridge Mountains are noted for having a bluish color when seen from a distance. Trees put the "blue" in Blue Ridge, from the isoprene released into the atmosphere. This contributes to the characteristic haze on the mountains and their distinctive color.

Industrial production
Isoprene is most readily available industrially as a byproduct of the thermal cracking of naphtha or oil, as a side product in the production of ethylene. About 800,000 metric tons are produced annually. About 95% of isoprene production is used to produce cis-1,4-polyisoprene—a synthetic version of natural rubber.

Natural rubber consists mainly of poly-cis-isoprene with a molecular mass of 100,000 to 1,000,000 g/mol. Typically natural rubber contains a few percent of other materials, such as proteins, fatty acids, resins, and inorganic materials. Some natural rubber sources, called gutta percha, are composed of trans-1,4-polyisoprene, a structural isomer that has similar, but not identical, properties.

See also 
 Natural rubber
 Neoprene

References

Further reading

External links 

 Report on Carcinogens, Fourteenth Edition; U.S. Department of Health and Human Services, Public Health Service, National Toxicology Program
 Science News article describing how isoprene released by plants is converted to light-scattering aerosols 

Alkadienes
Hemiterpenes
IARC Group 2B carcinogens
Monomers
Conjugated dienes